Rockbjörnen (Swedish: the Rock Bear) is a music prize in Sweden, divided into several categories, which is awarded annually by the newspaper Aftonbladet. The prize was first awarded in 1979, and is mostly centered on pop and rock.

In 2010, Rockbjörnen was redone and focused more on live performances. This initiative was hailed by artists and industry. The period for selecting the winners of Rockbjörnen was extended from one month to three months (all summer).

Categories

Rockbjörnen's Myspace prize

The year's best dance band

The year's best Swedish band

The year's best live group

The year's Swedish female artist

The year's female live act

The year's Swedish live act

The year's Swedish newcomer

The year's breakthrough

Swedish song of the year

The year's Swedish male artist

The year's male live act

The year's Swedish album

The year's foreign artist

The year's foreign group

The year's foreign song

The year's foreign album

The year's concert

The year's festival

The year's live act metal

The year's live act hard rock/metal

The Century's foreign group/artist

The century's Swedish group/artist

Qualifications

The year's female live artist, The year's male live artist & The year's livegroup
The artist will play at least three occasions in Sweden, at least three songs and the performance should be open to regular audience (fans) in front of the stage (not only on TV). The concerts must take place in Sweden.

The year's breakthrough
Formerly known as the prize The year’s Newcomer. The artist must have played in Sweden for public at least three occasions. Must not be their own concerts. Can be, for example, Rix FM Festival.

The year's concert
The performance will be the artist's own concert (not concerts like Rix FM Festival) in Sweden. It's enough with just one occasion.

The Year's hard rock/metal
The artist can be both from Sweden or another country, and must be current with a tour during the period.

Time of Rockbjörnen
For all categories for the period: From the day after Rockbjörnen gala until the voting form closes. For example, for the year 2012: September 1, 2011 to August 2, 2012

Livelöpet

'Livelöpet is an interactive digital scene on aftonbladet.se. where artists perform live concerts. At the concert, the audience can interact with both the artist and their Facebook friends through a variety of touch as to clap, shout, like songs, take pictures and post on Facebook, swaying with lighters and even making out with someone else in the audience. The artist takes part of all interactions.

Livelöpet was launched August 17, 2010 by Rockbjörnen Live, Aftonbladet's music prize since 1979, which that year went through a change and became a prize with focus on live performances. The investment was a strategic move to reposition Rockbjörnen from a traditional music prize to one that rewards the live scene in Sweden. The repositioning had its roots in the changing music industry underwent a technological paradigm shift (from about 1998 onwards) where music is increasingly consumed through digital media and the live scene grew stronger.

The first year seven Livelöpet concerts was performed, by Mando Diao, The Ark, Robyn, Salem Al Fakir,
Ola, Anna Bergendahl och Eric Saade.

The artist plays live in the Aftonbladet studio. The concert streamed live over the web and with a custom-built application where the audience can interact with each other and the artist through various buttons. The artist takes part of the audience interaction via a monitor in the studio where all shouts appear in a live feed, just as the number of applause, waving lighters and snogging. A live update of the most requested songs are also listed on the monitor and the artist can choose whether it wants to meet the audience's wishes or not. Concerts can also be experienced with no impact if desired.

This can the audience do during the live concerts: 
Clap your hands, 
Shout, 
Wishing songs, 
Taking photos and post them on Facebook, 
Sway with the lighters, 
Make out with a Facebook friend or someone in the audience, 
See the concert without any effects

The total number of unique visitors was 44 000. Total number of interactions between audience and artists was 2.4 million. 29 million people worldwide were reached by the news of Livelöpet, which was spread through social media. The number of unique visitors to www.rockbjornen.se was increased with more than 300%. Traffic from 63 countries could be measured during the seven concerts.

There are a lot of advantages of the interactive digital scene Livelöpet. The artist reaches out to a large number of fans wherever they are geographically, and then reaches the so-called Long tail. The concert can be experienced by people who do not normally have the opportunity to get to or go to concerts, such as minors.

Unlike TV format, "meets" the fans their idol in the digital space when he or she takes part of all interactions from the audience.

The name Livelöpet (Live rennet) comes from the original idea where the idea was that the concert would be live in a banner on Aftonbladet.se. Then it would be without any interaction possibilities with the different buttons. The banner would be designed as a headline on which the sender is an evening paper, hence the name Livelöpet (live rennet).

Prior to the Swedish Parliamentary elections in 2010 there was a variant of Livelöpet; Live Square. Parliamentary party leaders' made speeches through the web and responded directly to questions from the audience. The audience was applauding or booing the party leaders’ voice, put on a party-button and take pictures of the speech which they could post on Facebook.

SkapaTV

In SkapaTV for Rockbjörnen you can make your own music - for free both online and mobile. By simply assembling prefabricated clips where various artists giving live performances, interviews, and doing some fun things at the amusement park Gröna Lund in Stockholm, create your own personal movie. This is brand new and has never before been offered.

Artists who have performed at SkapaTV: Norlie & KKV, Molly Sandén, Ulrik Munther, Dead By April, Icona Pop, Linnea Henriksson & Panetoz.

References

Aftonbladet.se - Tidigare vinnare (1979-2008)

External links
 Website of Rockbjörnen (Swedish)
 Summary of Rockbjörnen 2010 on YouTube 
 Livelöpet the Aftonbladet arena (Swedish)
 SkapaTV (Swedish)
 Commercial for SkapaTV

1979 establishments in Sweden
Awards established in 1979
Swedish music awards